Millerhill railway station served the village of Millerhill, Scotland, from 1847 to 1965 on the Waverley Route.

History 
The station opened on 1 September 1847 by the North British Railway. Nearby was Millerhill Marshalling Yard (still open), which is situated south of Edinburgh, on the other side of the A1 from Musselburgh. 
From 1877 until 1933 it was the junction of a branch to Glencorse. The station closed to passengers on 7 November 1955 and to goods traffic on 25 January 1965.

The site today 
The only remains of the station today are the station building and the single track that ran through the station, which is also part of the south end of Millerhill Marshalling Yard.

References

External links 

Disused railway stations in Midlothian
Railway stations in Great Britain opened in 1847
Railway stations in Great Britain closed in 1955
Former North British Railway stations